Nice Talking to Me is the fifth studio album by American rock band Spin Doctors. It was released on September 13, 2005, and features the original four members of the band.

Production
The album was recorded in Los Angeles with producer Matt Wallace.

Critical reception
The New York Times wrote that the album "has ripping funk guitar and upbeat melodies that will sound familiar to the Spin Doctors' fans." In a review of a live show to promote the album, the Hartford Courant wrote that Nice Talking to Me "tunes such as 'Margarita' actually offered some indication the band might still have some boing left in its coils."

Track listing

Personnel
Spin Doctors
 Chris Barron – Lead vocals (except track 8), backing vocals, acoustic guitar on track 6
 Aaron Comess – percussion, drums, background vocals on tracks 1 and 9
 Eric Schenkman – guitar, backing vocals on tracks 1, 2, 5, 8, 9 and 10, lead vocals on track 8
 Mark White – bass, backing vocals on track 2

Additional musician
 Vince Jones - Keyboard on tracks 1, 4, 6 and 7

Production
 Producers: Matt Wallace
 Engineers: Mike Landolt
 Additional engineering: Posie Mliadi, Pete Martinez (at Sound City)
 Mixing: Matt Wallace
 Recording: Sound City (Van Nuys, CA)
 Mastering: Brian Gardner
 Art direction: Julian Peploe
 Photography: Mike Waring, Chris Barron & Aaron Comess

References

Spin Doctors albums
2005 albums
Albums produced by Matt Wallace
Albums recorded at Sound City Studios